The San Jose Civic (formerly known as the San Jose Civic Auditorium and City National Civic) is a former arena, currently operating as a theatre, located in downtown San Jose, California. The venue is owned by the City of San Jose, is managed by Team San Jose and is booked by Nederlander Concerts. The auditorium seats 3,036 which can be expanded up to 3,326 in a general admission setting.

History
The venue was created through a joint venture between the City of San Jose, Public Works Administration and local property owners Mr. and Mrs. T. S. Montgomery, who donated the property. The building was designed by Binder & Curtis, in the Spanish Colonial/California Mission Revival style.

The venue's naming rights were given to City National Bank in December 2013, with its original name being restored in May 2019.

The west wing was a convention hall called "Parkside Hall". It opened on September 22, 1977, as the "San Jose Convention Center". It served as the city's main convention center until a new facility of the same name opened across the street in 1989. The building was demolished in 2009.

A $25 million renovation of the venue (approved in 2007) was begun in 2009. A state-of-the-art sound and video system was installed, the building's floor was refurbished, an exterior lighting system was activated, and the loading dock was upgraded.  Key improvements planned included a top-line interior lighting system, seating upgrades to replace the decades-old plastic molded chairs, more restrooms, and a new concessions program.

Naming history
San Jose Municipal Auditorium 
San Jose Civic Auditorium 
City National Civic 
San Jose Civic

Montgomery Theater
The "Montgomery Theater" is attached to the east side of the building. Seating 486, it is the primary home of the CMT San Jose.

Notable events
Many of the most popular entertainers and public figures have appeared at the venue creating memorable historic events since its opening in 1936. Barbra Streisand appeared there during her first concert tour in 1963. Bob Dylan and the Hawks played a famous show there on December 12, 1965, and Allen Ginsberg made a tape of it now held by the Stanford University Libraries.  Earlier that year the Rolling Stones played a concert there that was attended by Ken Kesey and his Merry Pranksters who electrified a party afterward reportedly attended by Stones members. Richard Nixon made national headlines during an anti-war demonstration at the San Jose Civic.

It has presented major sporting events including boxing matches with champions such as Jack Dempsey and Joe Louis. The Civic hosted the final day of the GENESIS 3 Super Smash Bros. tournament in January 2016.  It was the venue for the trampoline events of the inaugural World Games I in 1981.

External links

Hermanas Padilla 1935 Concert Poster

References

Theatres in San Jose, California
Basketball venues in California
Boxing venues in California
Defunct college basketball venues in the United States
Mixed martial arts venues in California
Downtown San Jose
Music venues in the San Francisco Bay Area
Santa Clara Broncos basketball
San Jose State Spartans men's basketball
Sports venues in the San Francisco Bay Area
Sports venues in San Jose, California
Buildings and structures in San Jose, California
Tourist attractions in Silicon Valley
Buildings and structures completed in 1936
Sports venues completed in 1936
Music venues completed in 1936
Esports venues in California